Ferjenel Gonzales Biron (born December 26, 1964) is a Filipino politician and physician. He was the Representative of the 4th District of Iloilo from 2004 to 2013. He is the founder of the Pharmawealth Group of Companies and was the Chief Executive Officer until his election to Congress in 2004. 

Biron was elected as a member of the Commission on Appointments on August 8, 2022.

External links
 

Central Philippine University people
Central Philippine University alumni
1964 births
Living people
Members of the House of Representatives of the Philippines from Iloilo
People from Iloilo